Kid Gloves is a 1929 American pre-Code part-talkie drama film directed by Ray Enright, and starring Conrad Nagel, Lois Wilson, Edward Earle, Edna Murphy, and Maude Turner Gordon. The film was released by Warner Bros. on March 23, 1929.

Cast
Conrad Nagel as Kid Gloves
Lois Wilson as Ruth
Edward Earle as Penny
Edna Murphy as Lou
Maude Turner Gordon as Aunt
Richard Cramer as Butch
Tom Dugan as Duffy
John Davidson as Stone

Preservation
A print of the film survives at the George Eastman House.

References

External links

1929 drama films
American drama films
1929 films
American black-and-white films
Warner Bros. films
Transitional sound films
1920s English-language films
1920s American films